Stigmella kao is a moth of the family Nepticulidae. It is only known from Yunnan, China.

Larvae have been found in October, adults were reared in November.

The larvae feed on Castanopsis orthocantha. They mine the leaves of their host plant. The mine consists of a linear mine along the midrib of the leaf towards the tip, occasionally following a lateral vein, then suddenly turning back and becoming an elongated blotch. The frass almost fills the gallery, in a blotch in two lateral lines. The mine resembles that of some Ectoedemia species, such as Ectoedemia intimella.

External links
Nepticulidae (Lepidoptera) in China, 1. Introduction and Stigmella (Schrank) feeding on Fagaceae

Nepticulidae
Moths described in 2000
Endemic fauna of Yunnan
Moths of Asia